Two Days in November is the title of an album by Doc Watson and Merle Watson, released in 1974. The title refers to the two days it took to complete the recording.

Reception

In an AllMusic review, the music critic Lindsay Palmer wrote of the album, "Doc Watson's amplified approach to traditional melodies as well as the reworking of cover material is decidedly modern, yet the interpretations directly hark back to their acoustic counterparts... Seasoned as well as developing enthusiasts of bluegrass, newgrass, traditional country, and Americana agree that Doc & Merle Watson developed and created some of their finest music in the early to mid-'70s..."

At the Grammy Awards of 1975, Two Days in November won the 1974 Grammy Award for Best Ethnic or Traditional Folk Recording.

Reissues
Sugar Hill Records re-issued versions, which excluded some tracks, of both Two Days in November and Then and Now in 1994. BGO Records released both with additional tracks from The Elementary Doctor Watson! in 2002.

Track listing
 "Walk on Boy" (Mel Tillis, Wayne Walker) 2:44
 "Poor Boy Blues" (arranged and adapted by Doc Watson and Merle Watson) 2:18
 "I'm Going Fishing" (arranged and adapted by Doc Watson) 2:40
 "Kinfolks in Carolina" (Merle Travis) 2:28
 "Lonesome Moan" (Traditional; arranged and adapted by Doc Watson) 2:51
 "Medley: Little Beggar Man/Old Joe Clark" (Traditional; arranged and adapted by Doc Watson) 2:07
 "Kaw-Liga" (Fred Rose, Hank Williams) 2:44
 "Train That Carried My Girl from Town" (Traditional; arranged by Watson) 2:55
 "Snowbird" (Gene MacLellan) 2:51
 "Doc's Rag" (Doc Watson) 1:44

Personnel
Doc Watson – guitar, harmonica, vocals
Merle Watson – guitar, banjo
Kenny Malone – percussion
Chuck Cochran – piano
Joe Allen – bass guitar
Jim Isbell – drums, percussion

References

External links
  Doc Watson discography
 

1974 albums
Doc Watson albums
Albums produced by Jack Clement